The list of ship launches in 1695 includes a chronological list of some ships launched in 1695.


References

1695
Ship launches